Erkki Luiro (29 January 1940 – 2 August 1984) was a Finnish skier. He competed in the Nordic combined event at the 1964 Winter Olympics.

References

External links
 

1940 births
1984 deaths
Finnish male Nordic combined skiers
Olympic Nordic combined skiers of Finland
Nordic combined skiers at the 1964 Winter Olympics
People from Rovaniemi
Sportspeople from Lapland (Finland)
20th-century Finnish people